Super Crazy is the fourth album by American stand-up comedian, Todd Barry. It was released on July 24, 2012 by Comedy Central Records. A live DVD of the same name was also released on July 24, 2012. The album and special received positive reviews.

References

Todd Barry albums
2012 live albums
Comedy Central Records live albums
Stand-up comedy albums
2010s comedy albums
2010s spoken word albums
Live spoken word albums